Janice Leslie McCaffrey ( Turner, born October 20, 1959) is a retired female racewalker from Canada. She set her personal best in the women's 10 km race walk event (44:26) on May 11, 1995 in Eisenhüttenstadt.

Personal bests
10 km: 44:26 min –  Eisenhüttenstadt, 11 May 1996
20 km: 1:34:50 hrs –  Victoria, 13 August 2000

Achievements

References

External links
 
 
 
 
 
 

1959 births
Living people
Canadian female racewalkers
Athletes (track and field) at the 1987 Pan American Games
Athletes (track and field) at the 1995 Pan American Games
Athletes (track and field) at the 1999 Pan American Games
Athletes (track and field) at the 1990 Commonwealth Games
Athletes (track and field) at the 1994 Commonwealth Games
Athletes (track and field) at the 1998 Commonwealth Games
Athletes (track and field) at the 1992 Summer Olympics
Athletes (track and field) at the 1996 Summer Olympics
Athletes (track and field) at the 2000 Summer Olympics
Olympic track and field athletes of Canada
Sportspeople from Etobicoke
Pan American Games track and field athletes for Canada
Commonwealth Games bronze medallists for Canada
World Athletics Championships athletes for Canada
Commonwealth Games medallists in athletics
Athletes from Toronto
Medallists at the 1994 Commonwealth Games